Episode I, Episode 1 or Episode One may refer to:

 Star Wars: Episode I – The Phantom Menace, a 1999 film
 Half-Life 2: Episode One, a 2006 computer game sequel
 "Episode 1" (Ashes to Ashes), (2008), the first episode of the TV series Ashes to Ashes
 "Episode 1" (The Casual Vacancy), (2015), the first episode of the TV miniseries The Casual Vacancy
 "Episode 1" (Humans series 1), the first episode of the TV series Humans
 Episode 1 (company), a UK investment company
 Episode 1 (EP), an extended play by Broiler
 "Episode One" (Dark Matter), the first episode of Dark Matter
 "Episode 1.1" (Secret Diary of a Call Girl), the premiere episode of Secret Diary of a Call Girl

See also 
 List of television episodes named "Pilot", often the title of the first episode of a given television series.